Oleg Ivanovich Dudarin (born August 7, 1945) is a Russian professional football coach and a former player. He is currently a technical director with FC Energiya Volzhsky.

External links
 Career summary by KLISF

1945 births
Living people
Soviet footballers
FC Dynamo Stavropol players
Russian football managers
Association football midfielders